Vršački Ritovi is a village located in Serbia at 45° 9' 38" North, 21° 10' 19" East. It is situated in the Vršac municipality, in Banat region (South Banat District), Vojvodina province.

Name 

In Serbian, the village is known as Вршачки Ритови or Vršački Ritovi, in Hungarian as Verseci Rétek, and in Croatian as Vršački Ritovi.

The name of village means "Marshes Of Vršac", because village is situated on the place of former marshes.

History 

Village is pretty new, and was built around former large agricultural corporation "Vršački Ritovi", once driving economical force of the region. Place was populated before that, yet with just few houses. Beginning from 1950s, village started to grow, and reached its peak in mid-1970s and 1980s, with its small but pretty rich population. Break-up of Yugoslavia brought decline of village. Leaned mostly on agricultural corporation in which majority of inhabitants were employed, village started its rapid decline. Imposed UN embargo on Yugoslavia brought halt to export of agricultural products, while breakup of USSR, its major market, brought total collapse. Corporation was state-owned, and started to break up itself into small companies, out of whom only fish farm remained in work.

Geography 

Being officially classified as a single village, Vršački Ritovi is actually composed of two separate inhabited places: proper Vršački Ritovi, which is situated near the railroad that connects Vršac and Zrenjanin and is some 3 km far from regional road, and Novogradnja.

Proper Vršački Ritovi is commonly named by inhabitants as Pumpa - "The Pump", because on that place in the past was water pump.

Novogradnja got its name for Serbian word for newly built place, and is situated on the regional Vršac-Zrenjanin road, near the administrative building of former corporation and wheat silo. Smaller than Pumpa, Novogradnja is actually main part of Vršački Ritovi and is still activelly inhabited place.

Demography

The village has a Serb ethnic majority (65.93%) with a seizable Hungarian (15.38%) and Rroma people (7.69%). Its total population numbering 37 inhabitants (2011 census).

Historical population 

1961: 636
1971: 424
1981: 224
1991: 156
2002: 91
2011: 37

References 
Slobodan Ćurčić, Broj stanovnika Vojvodine, Novi Sad, 1996.

See also 
List of places in Serbia
List of cities, towns and villages in Vojvodina

Populated places in Serbian Banat
Populated places in South Banat District
Vršac